This is the complete list of Commonwealth Games medallists in fencing from 1950 to 1970.

Men's foil

Men's foil team

Men's épée

Men's épée team

Men's sabre

Men's sabre team

Women's foil

Women's foil team

See also
 Fencing at the Commonwealth Games

References
Results Database from the Commonwealth Games Federation

Fencing
Medalists

Commonwealth